Laj or Loj may refer to:
 Ləj, Azerbaijan 
 Loj, Mazandaran  (لج - Loj)
 Laj, Razavi Khorasan (لاج - Lāj)
 Laj, West Azerbaijan (لج - Laj)
 Loj Island, Erikub Atoll, Marshall Islands

See also
 LAJ (disambiguation)